Choctaw County is a county located in the southwestern portion of the U.S. state of Alabama. As of the 2020 census, the population was 12,665. The county seat is Butler. The county was established on December 29, 1847, and named for the Choctaw tribe of Native Americans.

History
Choctaw County was originally part of the Choctaw Nation, with Choctaw settlements known to be in the vicinity of Pushmataha prior to the removal of Native Americans from the southeastern United States during the Trail of Tears.

Most of the early European American pioneers of Choctaw County were farmers from North and South Carolina.  In 1912 the Alabama, Tennessee and Northern Railroad was completed through the county from north to south, connecting the area to the Port of Mobile and northern Alabama. It induced a population shift from areas near the Tombigbee River to the central part of the county.

The county's population reached its peak in the 1920s, due in part from jobs created by a sawmill boom with companies as the E. E. Jackson Lumber Company and Choctaw Lumber Company.  The sawmill industry collapsed during the Great Depression.  The first successful oil well in Alabama was drilled at Gilbertown in 1944, with oil and gas becoming the county's most important industry.  This industry waned by the 1970s as the wells lost profitability.

An African-American family, the Thorntons of Mobile, was featured in the September 24, 1956, issue of Life Magazine.  The article included an interview with the Thorntons' daughter, Allie Lee Causey, of Shady Grove in Choctaw County.  In the article, Mrs. Causey, a schoolteacher, spoke openly about her family's life, stating that "integration is the only way in which Negroes will receive justice. We cannot get it as a separate people. If we can get justice on our jobs, and equal pay, then we'll be able to afford better homes and good education."  When the magazine was seen in Choctaw County, the Causeys were subjected to brutal economic retaliation by white residents, who tried to coerce Mrs. Causey into recanting her remarks.  Their loans were called in, local stores refused to sell them food and gasoline, Willie Causey was cut off from his employment as a woodcutter, and Mrs. Causey was fired from her job as a teacher.  The Causeys left Shady Grove and Alabama for good in October 1956.

Apparel factories opened during the 1950s–60s in Silas, Toxey, and Butler, although the plants had largely closed by the 21st century.  The 1950s also saw the building a paper mill at Naheola, now owned and operated by Georgia-Pacific.  The county was declared a disaster area in September 1979, due to damage from Hurricane Frederic.  The 1980s saw the main railroad close and the tracks removed.

Historic sites
Choctaw County has one site listed on the National Register of Historic Places, the Mount Sterling Methodist Church.  Additionally, five sites are listed on the Alabama Register of Landmarks and Heritage.

Geography

Major highways
 U.S. Highway 84
 State Route 10
 State Route 17
 State Route 114
 State Route 156

Adjacent counties
Sumter County (north)
Marengo County (northeast)
Clarke County (southeast)
Washington County (south)
Wayne County, Mississippi (southwest)
Clarke County, Mississippi (west)
Lauderdale County, Mississippi (northwest)

National protected area
 Choctaw National Wildlife Refuge

Demographics

2020 census

As of the 2020 United States Census, there were 12,665 people, 5,300 households, and 3,440 families residing in the county.

2010 census
As of the 2010 United States census, there were 13,859 people living in the county. 55.8% were White, 43.4% Black or African American, 0.1% Native American, 0.1% Asian, 0.2% of some other race and 0.4% of two or more races. 0.5% were Hispanic or Latino (of any race).

2000 census
As of the census of 2000, there were 15,922 people, 6,363 households, and 4,574 families living in the county.  The population density was 17 people per square mile (7/km2).  There were 7,839 housing units at an average density of 9 per square mile (3/km2).  The racial makeup of the county was 55.14% White, 44.13% Black or African American, 0.16% Native American, 0.04% Asian, 0.11% from other races, and 0.42% from two or more races.  0.67% of the population were Hispanic or Latino of any race.

There were 6,363 households, out of which 32.50% had children under the age of 18 living with them, 52.00% were married couples living together, 16.00% had a female householder with no husband present, and 28.10% were non-families. 26.50% of all households were made up of individuals, and 11.60% had someone living alone who was 65 years of age or older.  The average household size was 2.48 and the average family size was 2.99.

In the county, the population was spread out, with 26.10% under the age of 18, 7.90% from 18 to 24, 26.20% from 25 to 44, 25.20% from 45 to 64, and 14.60% who were 65 years of age or older.  The median age was 38 years. For every 100 females there were 88.80 males.  For every 100 females age 18 and over, there were 85.40 males.

The median income for a household in the county was $24,749, and the median income for a family was $31,870. Males had a median income of $32,316 versus $18,760 for females. The per capita income for the county was $14,635.  About 20.70% of families and 24.50% of the population were below the poverty line, including 34.80% of those under age 18 and 26.10% of those age 65 or over.

Education 
Choctaw County contains one public school district. There are approximately 1,100 students in public PK-12 schools in Choctaw County.

Districts 
School districts include:

 Choctaw County School District

Government
Choctaw County leans Republican at the presidential level. The last Democrat to win the county in a presidential election is Al Gore, who won it by a slim majority in 2000.

Communities

Towns
Butler (county seat)
Gilbertown
Lisman
Needham
Pennington
Silas
Toxey

Census-designated place
Cullomburg (partly in Washington County)

Unincorporated communities

Barrytown
Bladon Springs
Cromwell
Edna
Jachin
Melvin
Mount Sterling
Pushmataha
Riderwood
Robjohn
Spring Hill
Yantley

See also
National Register of Historic Places listings in Choctaw County, Alabama
Properties on the Alabama Register of Landmarks and Heritage in Choctaw County, Alabama

References

External links
The Choctaw Sun-Advocate
 Coastal Gateway Regional Economic Development Alliance
Choctaw County map of roads/towns (map © 2007 Univ. of Alabama).
Choctaw County Tourism and Business Directory

 

Alabama placenames of Native American origin
 
1847 establishments in Alabama
Populated places established in 1847